Thomas Hylland Eriksen (born February 6, 1962) is a Norwegian anthropologist. He is currently a professor of social anthropology at the University of Oslo, as well as the 2015–2016 president of the European Association of Social Anthropologists. He is a member of the Norwegian Academy of Science and Letters.

Academic career
Born in Oslo, Eriksen has done fieldwork in Trinidad and Mauritius, and later in Norway and Australia. He is currently doing research on scale and globalisation in the Seychelles. His fields of research include identity, nationalism, globalisation and identity politics. Eriksen finished his dr. polit. degree in 1991, and was made a professor in 1995, at the age of 33. From 1993 to 2001 he was editor of the bimonthly cultural journal Samtiden.

A considerable portion of Eriksen's work has focused on popularizing social anthropology and conveying basic cultural relativism as well as criticism of Norwegian nationalism in the Norwegian public debate. He has written the basic textbook used in the introductory courses in social anthropology at most Scandinavian universities. The book, "Small Places -- Large Issues" in English, is also used in introductory courses in many other countries , and has been widely translated, as has his other major textbook, "Ethnicity and Nationalism: Anthropological Perspectives". Eriksen is a frequent contributor of newspaper pieces in Scandinavia. 

Between 2004 and 2010, Eriksen directed an interdisciplinary research programme, Cultural Complexity in the New Norway (CULCOM), at the University of Oslo. In a programmatic statement, he said that a main goal was to "redraw the map of Norway" to make it fit the new transnational, complex and globalised realities. A book which sums up the empirical results and theoretical perspectives resulting from CULCOM is Samfunn (Society, 2010).

One quote from Eriksen made in the context of his CULCOM involvement has become a focal point in the 1,500-page manifesto of Anders Behring Breivik, the perpetrator of the 2011 Norway attacks, as well as in Breivik's defence speech during his 2012 trial.

Thomas Hylland Eriksen has also been a frequently interviewed commentator of the trial of Anders Behring Breivik, where he has also been called as a defence witness.

In 2011, Eriksen was awarded an Advanced Grant from the European Research Council. Under the heading "OVERHEATING", he directed research on three major crises of globalisation—economy/finance, environment/climate and identity/culture. This project is both comparative and interdisciplinary. Starting in late 2012, it was completed in 2017.

Politics
Eriksen has been a minor political candidate for the Norwegian Liberal Party. In the local election of 2011, he was a minor candidate for the Norwegian Green Party in Oslo. He was also a minor candidate for the Norwegian Green Party in the 2013 general election.

Honours
Eriksen is an honorary doctor at Stockholm University, of The University of Copenhagen and of the Charles University in Prague, a member of the Norwegian Academy of Science, an honorary member of the Royal Anthropological Institute and an External Scientific Member of the Max Planck Society. He is the recipient of several awards for his popularisation of science, and received the University of Oslo Research Prize in 2017 and the Vega Medal in 2022.

Works

Selected works in English
 Us and Them in Modern Societies (1992)
Ethnicity And Nationalism (1993/2010) Widely translated.
Small Places -- Large Issues (1995/2010/2014) Widely translated, in Greek as Μικροί τόποι, μεγάλα ζητήματα
Common Denominators: Ethnicity, Nationalism and the Politics of Compromise in Mauritius (1998)
A History Of Anthropology (2001, with F. S. Nielsen, 2nd edition 2013) Translated into Portuguese, Arabic, Norwegian, Swedish
Tyranny of the Moment: Fast and Slow Time in the Information Age (2001) Translated into more than 25 languages.
Globalisation: Studies in Anthropology (2003, ed.)
What Is Anthropology? (2004) Widely translated
Engaging Anthropology: The Case For A Public Presence (2006)
Globalization: The Key Concepts (2007, 2nd edition 2014)
Flag, Nation and Identity in Europe and America (2007, ed. w/Richard Jenkins)
Paradoxes of Cultural Recognition (2009, ed. w/Halleh Ghorashi and Sharam Alghasi)
A World of Insecurity (2010, ed. w/Ellen Bal and Oscar Salemink)
Fredrik Barth: An Intellectual Biography (2015)
Overheating: An Anthropology of Accelerated Change (2016)
Identities Destabilised: Living in an Overheated World (edited with Elisabeth Schober, 2016)
Knowledge and Power in an Overheated World (edited with Elisabeth Schober, 2017). Free e-book, downloadable here.
An Overheated World: An Anthropological History of the Early Twenty-First Century (editor, 2018)
 Boomtown: Runaway Globalisation on the Queensland Coast (2018)
 The Mauritian Paradox: Fifty Years of Development, Democracy and Diversity (editor with Ramola Ramtohul, 2018)
 Ethnic Groups and Boundaries Today: A Legacy of Fifty Years (editor with Marek Jakoubek, 2019)
 Cooling Down: Local Responses to Global Climate Change (editor with Susanna M. Hoffman and Paulo Mendes, 2021)

In Norwegian
 1989: Hvor mange hvite elefanter? Kulturdimensjonen i bistandsarbeidet (editor) ISBN 82-417-0019-9
1991: Veien til et mer eksotisk Norge Forsvar for kulturelt mangfold. ISBN 82-417-0094-6
1993: Typisk norsk: essays om kulturen i Norge ISBN 82-7003-121-6
1993: Små steder – store spørsmål. Innføring i sosialantropologi
1993: Kulturterrorismen: Et oppgjør med tanken om kulturell renhet ISBN 82-430-0151-4
1994: Kulturelle veikryss. Essays om kreolisering om kulturblanding ISBN 8200039358
1994: Kulturforskjeller i praksis (with Torunn Arntsen Sajjad) (7 revised editions, last in 2019)
1995: Det nye fiendebildet Updated and extended version 2001: Bak fiendebildet.
1996: Kampen om fortiden (originally in Swedish: Historia, myt och identitet)
1997: Charles Darwin, ISBN 8205253056
1997: Flerkulturell forståelse (editor), ISBN 8251835755
1999: Egoisme (with Dag O. Hessen), ISBN 82-03-22388-5
1999: Ambivalens og fundamentalisme (editor with Oscar Hemer)
2001: Øyeblikkets tyranni. Rask og langsom tid i informasjonsalderen, ISBN 82-03-22821-6
2002: Til verdens ende og tilbake: antropologiens historie (with Finn Sivert Nielsen), ISBN 82-7674-291-2
2004: Hva er sosialantropologi, 150-siders lyninnføring i faget. ISBN 82-15-00495-4
2004: Røtter og føtter: identitet i en omskiftelig tid om historie og identitet ISBN 82-525-5182-3
2005: Internett i praksis : om teknologiens uregjerlighet (editor) ISBN 82-304-0005-9
2005: Menneske og samfunn: samfunnskunnskap, sosiologi, sosialantropologi (with Erik Sølvberg and Hans Arne Kjelsaas), ISBN 82-03-33300-1
2006: Kosmopolitikk (with Halvor Finess Tretvoll) ISBN 82-02-26565-7
2006: Normalitet (editor with Jan-Kåre Breivik)
2006: Trygghet (editor)
2007: Frihet (editor with Arne Johan Vetlesen)
2007: Grenser for kultur? (editor with Øivind Fuglerud)
2008: Storeulvsyndromet: Jakten på lykken i overflodssamfunnet, ISBN 978-8-20329-126-5
2008: Globalisering: Åtte nøkkelbegreper 
2010: Samfunn
2010: Kulturell kompleksitet i det nye Norge (editor with Hans Erik Næss), ISBN 978-8-27477-528-2
2011: Søppel: Avfall i en verden av bivirkninger
2012: På stedet løp: Konkurransens paradokser (with Dag O. Hessen)
2012: Den globale drabantbyen (editor with Sharam Alghasi and Elisabeth Eide). ISBN 978-8-20238-655-9
2013: Fredrik Barth: En intellektuell biografi, ISBN 978-8-21502-232-1
2021: Appenes planet: Hvordan smarttelefonen forandret verden

References

External links

Overheating website
CULCOM website
Home page on UiO
Personal website
What is Ethnicity?
Minorities and the state
 Interviewed by Alan Macfarlane 13 June 2019 (video)

1962 births
Living people
People from Nøtterøy
Norwegian anthropologists
Academic staff of the University of Oslo
Scholars of nationalism
Members of the Norwegian Academy of Science and Letters
Norwegian magazine editors
20th-century Norwegian novelists
21st-century Norwegian novelists
Norwegian saxophonists
21st-century saxophonists
Expatriates in Seychelles